The Arab Voice (in Arabic صوت العروبة transliterated Sawt al Ourouba) is a New Jersey-based Arabic newspaper, published by and for Arab Americans. The paper's editor, Walid Rabah, founded the paper in Paterson in 1992.

In 2002, the newspaper came under criticism for publishing excerpts from The Protocols of the Elders of Zion, a forged document over a century old which is often used as anti-Semitic propaganda because it details a supposed Jewish plot for world domination.  In its defense, the newspaper stated that it was not making such statements itself; Rabah claimed he published the excerpts because the Protocols were widely circulated and accepted as genuine in much of the Arab world.

References

  Archived at adcnj.us. Retrieved 2005-12-26.

External links
Official website

Arab-American culture in New Jersey
Arabic-language newspapers published in the United States
Newspapers published in New Jersey
Publications established in 1992
Non-English-language newspapers published in New Jersey